Hein Poulus (born c. 1947) is a Canadian former American football executive and lawyer.

A native of Canada, Poulus earned law degrees from both the University of British Columbia and the London School of Economics. He gradually took over multiple positions of general manager Grady Alderman, and Poulus was named vice president and general manager of the team on December 3, . He assumed the positions on January 1, and helped the team achieve a playoff berth that year. Edgar Kaiser sold the team in the following year to Pat Bowlen, which led to Poulus quitting in July .

References

1940s births
Living people
Denver Broncos executives